Annika Beck was the 2012 champion, but was no longer eligible to compete in junior tennis, and thus couldn't defend her title.

Belinda Bencic won her first junior grand slam, defeating doubles partner Antonia Lottner in the final, 6–1, 6–3.

Seeds

Main draw

Finals

Top half

Section 1

Section 2

Bottom half

Section 3

Section 4

External links 
 Main draw

Girls' Singles
French Open, 2013 Girls' Singles